The 2007–08 Edmonton Oilers season began on October 4, 2007. It was the Oilers' 36th season and the 29th of which it has been participating in the National Hockey League (NHL). This season also marks the debut of the Edmonton Oil Kings, a Western Hockey League expansion team purchased by the Oilers after the team spent several years attempting to buy and relocate any existing WHL team to Edmonton.

2007 off-season
With major rebuilding necessary, the Oilers began the NHL free agency period on July 1, trading Joffrey Lupul and Jason Smith to the Philadelphia Flyers for defencemen Joni Pitkanen, left winger Geoff Sanderson and a third-round pick in the 2009 NHL Entry Draft.

Petr Sykora, having become a free agent, left the Oilers franchise and signed with the Pittsburgh Penguins. Jan Hejda, also a free agent, left for the Columbus Blue Jackets.

The Oilers made a call to Ryan Smyth's agent early in the morning on July 1 stating they were interested in making an offer. Smyth wound up signing with the Colorado Avalanche.

Goaltender Mathieu Garon was signed on July 3, 2007, as the backup to Dwayne Roloson.

It has also been reported that the Oilers had agreed to a contract with free agent Michael Nylander through his agent. While the Oilers were expecting a signed contract from Nylander and his agent, they later found out that he had signed with the Washington Capitals instead. The Oilers are currently pursuing their legal options on the matter.

Matt Greene and Raffi Torres signed two- and three-year contracts, respectfully.

On July 5, the Oilers offered restricted free agent Thomas Vanek from the Buffalo Sabres a seven-year contract worth $50 million.  The Buffalo Sabres quickly matched the Oilers offer.

On July 12, the Oilers signed unrestricted free agent Sheldon Souray to a five-year, $27 million deal.

On July 20, the Oilers signed Newly acquired defenceman Joni Pitkanen to a one-year, $2.4 million deal.

On July 26, the Oilers offered Anaheim Ducks forward Dustin Penner, a restricted free agent $21.25 million over five years; this is the second restricted free agent the Oilers have attempted to sign this off-season. The Ducks declined to match the offer, officially making Penner an Oiler.

On October 2, 2007, the Oilers announced Ethan Moreau as the 15th captain in team history.

2007–08 regular season
On February 19, 2008, Denis Grebeshkov scored the Oilers' 8,000th goal in franchise history.

On February 26, 2008, the Edmonton Oilers set a new NHL record for 13 shootout wins in a season, previously held by the Dallas Stars, at 12 wins. Oilers goaltender Mathieu Garon has stopped 30 of 32 shots and is 10–0 in shootouts.

On March 4, 2008, Gilbert surpassed Paul Coffey and Marc-Andre Bergeron for the Oilers' franchise record for most goals scored by a rookie defencemen with his tenth goal on the power play against the Nashville Predators goaltender Dan Ellis.

On March 18, 2008, the Oilers scored eight goals for the first time in five years in an 8–4 win over the Phoenix Coyotes.

April, 2008, Oilers fail to qualify for the 2008 Stanley Cup playoffs.

Regular season

Divisional standings

Conference standings

Schedule and results

Playoffs
The Oilers failed to qualify for the playoffs for the second consecutive season.

Player statistics

Skaters
Note: GP = Games played; G = Goals; A = Assists; Pts = Points; PIM = Penalty minutes

Goaltenders
Note: GP = Games played; TOI = Time on ice (minutes); W = Wins; L = Losses; OT = Overtime/shootout losses; GA = Goals against; SO = Shutouts; SV% = Save percentage; GAA = Goals against average

Awards and records

Records
18 Years, 55 Days: New Oilers records for the youngest player ever played and earned his first NHL point, assisting on Tom Gilbert's goal, by Sam Gagner on October 4, 2007.
Note: Wayne Gretzky had an unofficial Oilers record for the youngest player ever played in franchise history, including WHA, at age 17 Years, 281 Days on November 3, 1978.
18 Years, 71 Days: A new Oilers record for the youngest player ever scored by Sam Gagner on October 20, 2007.
4: A new NHL record for most consecutive shootouts on December 18, 2007.
8: A new Oilers record for most consecutive game assist for rookies by Sam Gagner on February 22, 2008.
15: NHL record for most shootout wins in a season.
13: A new NHL team record for most shootout wins in a season on February 26, 2008.
13: Oilers record for most goals for a rookie defenseman by Tom Gilbert.
10: A new Oilers record for most goals for a rookie defenseman on March 4, 2008.
3: A new NHL record for most consecutive overtime goals by Andrew Cogliano on March 11, 2008.
33: A new Oilers record for most points for a rookie defenseman by Tom Gilbert on March 28, 2008.
19: A new NHL record for most shootouts in a season on March 28, 2008.

Milestones

Transactions
The Oilers have been involved in the following transactions during the 2007–08 season.

Trades

Free agents acquired

Free agents lost

Players re-signed

Draft picks
Edmonton's picks at the 2007 NHL Entry Draft in Columbus, Ohio. The Oilers have three first round selections in this draft: sixth overall, the 15th pick, acquired in the Ryan Smyth trade, and the 30th pick, acquired in the Chris Pronger trade.

Farm teams

Springfield Falcons
After shipping their prospects out across several clubs, the Oilers have signed a deal with the Springfield Falcons to be their American Hockey League (AHL) affiliate in 2007–08. The Falcons will be the Oilers first full-time AHL affiliate since the Edmonton Road Runners were suspended following the 2004–05 season.

Stockton Thunder
The Stockton Thunder of the ECHL remain Edmonton's secondary affiliate.

See also
2006–07 NHL season

References

Player stats: 
Game log: 

Team standings: 

Oilers
ED
2007-08